The United Nations Educational, Scientific and Cultural Organization (UNESCO) designates World Heritage Sites of outstanding universal value to cultural or natural heritage which have been nominated by countries which are signatories to the UNESCO World Heritage Convention, established in 1972. Cultural heritage consists of monuments (such as architectural works, monumental sculptures, or inscriptions), groups of buildings, and sites (including archaeological sites). Natural features (consisting of physical and biological formations), geological and physiographical formations (including habitats of threatened species of animals and plants), and natural sites which are important from the point of view of science, conservation or natural beauty, are defined as natural heritage. Azerbaijan ratified the convention on 16 December 1993.

, Azerbaijan has three sites on the list. The first site added to the list was the Walled City of Baku with the Shirvanshah's Palace and Maiden Tower, in 2000. Due to the damage sustained in the 2000 Baku earthquake, the site was listed as endangered from 2003 to 2009. The Gobustan Rock Art Cultural Landscape was listed in 2007. In 2013, these two sites were given enhanced protection status by the Committee for the Protection of Cultural Property in the Event of Armed Conflict. The most recent site listed was the Historic Centre of Sheki with the Khan's Palace, in 2019. All three sites are cultural sites. In addition, Azerbaijan has ten sites on the tentative list.

World Heritage Sites 
UNESCO lists sites under ten criteria; each entry must meet at least one of the criteria. Criteria i through vi are cultural, and vii through x are natural.

Tentative list 
In addition to the sites on the World Heritage list, member states can maintain a list of tentative sites that they may consider for nomination. Nominations for the World Heritage list are only accepted if the site has previously been listed on the tentative list. , Azerbaijan had 10 such sites on its tentative list.

References

External links

World Heritage Sites
Azerbaijan

World Heritage Sites
World Heritage Sites